John Edward Deane Browne, 5th Baron Kilmaine  (18 March 1878 – 27 August 1946) was an Anglo-Irish politician and landowner. He sat in the House of Lords, within the Imperial British Parliament, as an Irish representative peer (1911–1946).

Biography
Browne was born in England, the only child of Francis Browne, 4th Baron Kilmaine and Alice Emily Shute. He was the nephew of Sir Cameron Shute. He was educated at Magdalen College, Oxford, and abroad.

His father, who reportedly suffered from "acute nervous disease" for many years, died by suicide in 1907, when he jumped out of a hotel room in Paris, where he had gone for treatment. John succeeded him as the 5th Baron Kilmaine. In 1911, he was elected to serve as an  Irish representative peer in the UK Parliament.

Browne inherited considerable lands from his father. He sold the family seat of Gaulstown Park, County Westmeath in 1918. He sold their estate at Nealepark in Neale, County Mayo and remaining Irish lands in 1925 and moved to Great Britain.

Lord Kilmaine died in Bexhill Hospital in 1946 of poisoning with carbolic acid, after drinking disinfectant.  His physician testified at the inquest that his mental condition had deteriorated since an illness five months earlier. A jury returned a verdict of "suicide while of unsound mind."

Marriage and issue
On 17 December 1906, he married Lady Aline Kennedy, daughter of the 3rd Marquess of Ailsa. They had three children: 

John Francis Archibald Browne, 6th Baron Kilmaine (22 September 1902 – 26 July 1978) 
Hon. Henry George Angus Browne (9 October 1911 – 8 September 1942), killed in the Second World War near El Alamein
Hon. Alicia Evelyn Browne (Feb. 1909–1992), married Cdr Edward St John Edmonstone, son of Sir Archibald Edmonstone, 5th Baronet

References

External links

 

1878 births
John
20th-century Anglo-Irish people
Irish Anglicans
Alumni of Magdalen College, Oxford
Barons in the Peerage of Ireland
Irish representative peers
British politicians who committed suicide
Suicides in England
Suicides by poison
1946 deaths
1946 suicides